Pine Creek Township is located in Ogle County, Illinois, United States.  As of the 2010 census, its population was 758 and it contained 320 housing units.

Geography

Demographics

References

External links
 US Census
 City-data.com
 Ogle County Official Site

Townships in Ogle County, Illinois
Townships in Illinois